Otoče is a village on the Sava River in the Municipality of Radovljica in the Upper Carniola region of Slovenia.

References

External links

Otoče at Geopedia

Populated places in the Municipality of Radovljica